This is a list of electoral results for the Electoral district of Briggs in South Australian state elections from 1985 to 1989.

Members for Briggs

Election results

Elections in the 1980s

References 

South Australian state electoral results by district